Newar Buddhism is the form of Vajrayana Buddhism practiced by the Newar people of the Kathmandu Valley, Nepal. It has developed unique socio-religious elements, which include a non-monastic Buddhist society based on the Newar caste system and patrilineality.  The ritual priestly (guruju) caste, vajracharya (who perform rituals for others) and shakya (who perform rituals mostly within their own families) form the non-celibate religious clergy caste while other Buddhist Newar castes like the Urāy act as patrons. Uray also patronise Tibetan Vajrayana, Theravadin, and even Japanese clerics. It is the oldest known sect of the Vajrayana tradition outdating the Tibetan school of Vajrayana by more than 600 years.

Although there was a vibrant regional tradition of Buddhism in the Kathmandu Valley during the first millennium, the transformation into a distinctive cultural and linguistic form of Buddhism appears to have taken place in the fifteenth century, at about the same time that similar regional forms of Indic Buddhism such as those of Kashmir and Indonesia were on the wane. As a result, Newar Buddhism seems to preserve some aspects of Indian Buddhism that were not preserved in Vajrayana schools elsewhere.

Canon 
Newar Buddhism has a group of nine Sanskrit Mahayana sutras called the Navagrantha, these are considered the key Mahayana sutra texts of the tradition. They are:

 Aṣṭasāhasrikā Prajñāpāramitā Sūtra
 Saddharma Puṇḍarīka Sūtra
 Suvarṇaprabhāsa Sūtra
 Samādhirāja Sūtra
 Gandavyūha Sūtra
 Laṅkāvatāra Sūtra
 Daśabhūmika Sūtra
 Lalitavistara Sūtra
 Tathāgataguhya (the sutra was lost, and replaced by the Guhyasamaja)

Artistic tradition

Newar Buddhism is characterized by its extensive and detailed rituals, a rich artistic tradition of Buddhist monuments and artwork like the chaitya (stupa), Baha and Bahi monastic courtyards, statues, paubha scroll paintings and mandala sand paintings, and by being a storehouse of ancient Sanskrit Buddhist texts, many of which are now only extant in Nepal.

According to the authors of Rebuilding Buddhism: The Theravada Movement in Twentieth-Century Nepal: "Today traditional Newar Buddhism is unquestionably in retreat before Theravada Buddhism." Chachā (Charyā) ritual song and dance and Gunlā Bājan music are other artistic traditions of Newar Buddhism. Although Newar Buddhism was traditionally bound to the Kathmandu Valley and its environs, there is at least one new Newar Buddhist temple in Portland, Oregon.

Outdoor festivals

A number of major street celebrations are held periodically involving processions, displays of Buddha images and services in the three cities of the Kathmandu Valley and in other parts of Nepal.

The main events are Samyak (almsgiving and display of Buddha images), Gunla (holy month marked by musical processions and display of Buddha images), Jana Baha Dyah Jatra (chariot procession in Kathmandu), Bunga Dyah Jatra (chariot processions in Lalitpur, Dolakha and Nala), and Bajrayogini Jatra (processions in Sankhu and Pharping).

See also
 Buddhism in Nepal
 Kindo Baha
 List of Buddhist stotras in Nepalbhasha
 List of Mahaviharas of Newar Buddhism
 List of monasteries in Nepal
 List of stupas in Nepal
 Pranidhipurna Mahavihar
 Vajracharya
 Chinese Esoteric Buddhism
 Indonesian Esoteric Buddhism

References

Further reading
 - Review of this book Theodore Riccardi Jr.

 Locke, John K. Newar Buddhist Initiation Rites
 Mahajan, Phra Sujan  (B.E. 2549). The Revival of Theravada Buddhism and its Contribution to Nepalese Society, Thesis, Bangkok: Mahachulalongkornrajavidyalaya University

External links
Bajracharya
The Art of Newar Buddhism, The Huntington Archive
 Newar news

 
Buddhism in Nepal
Newar
Newar religion